The Swift 008.a is an open-wheel formula racing car, designed, developed and built by American company Swift Engineering, for use in the Formula Atlantic spec-series, between 1998 and 2001. It was powered by a naturally aspirated  Toyota 4A-GE four-cylinder engine, producing , which drove the rear wheels through a 5-speed Hewland sequential gearbox. It was succeeded by the 014.a in 2002.

References

Swift Engineering vehicles
Formula Atlantic
Open wheel racing cars